A sonar decoy is a device for decoying sonar. Most are released from submarines to act as a false target.

Submarine decoys 

The first submarine decoys were the German Bold fitted to U-boats of World War II. These were a pellet of calcium hydride in a simple metal container. On contact with sea water, the calcium hydride decomposed to produce a trail of hydrogen gas bubbles that acted as a bubble curtain and reflected ASDIC impulses to produce a false target. The container trapped hydrogen and floated, with a crude spring valve to maintain buoyancy to keep it at a constant depth.

Later decoys, such as Sieglinde, were motorised and could deploy their false target away from the host submarine, increasing safety.

Torpedo decoys 
Decoys were also used by surface ships to decoy the developing acoustic torpedoes. These were usually towed behind the host.

Example decoys

Bubble decoys 
Reflective bubble targets
 Bold
 Sieglinde

Hammer and explosive decoys 
These were intended to swamp the listening device with noise
 Siegmund

Signature decoys 
 AN/SLQ-25 Nixie
 Mobile submarine simulator

Towed decoys 
 Foxer, a British towed decoy to decoy acoustic torpedoes away from surface ships. Also used by the US as FXR and the Canadians as CAT.
  T-Mk 6 Fanfare, US development of Foxer

References

External links 

 

 01
U-boats